"I Feel It in My Bones" is a song by Las Vegas-based rock band The Killers. The song was the band's 7th consecutive Christmas song and is a sequel to their 2007 song, "Don't Shoot Me Santa". As with their six previous releases, all proceeds from this song goes to AIDS charities as part of the Product Red campaign.

Release
The song premiered on RollingStone on December 1, 2012. The song was made available in digital stores on December 4.

Music video
The music video for the song again features Ryan Pardey, who reprises his role as Santa, from "Don't Shoot Me Santa" (2007).  The video was directed by Roboshobo, who also directed the band's previous Christmas Single "The Cowboy's Christmas Ball" (2011).  The video shows Santa hunting down The Killers members in order to kill them, as they feature on his "Naughty" list.  On his travels, Santa encounters a gas station attendant, played by Tony Vannucci, brother of the band's drummer, Ronnie.  Upon seeing a reindeer's head mounted on the wall, Santa binds the attendant with tinsel and blows up the building with a decorated grenade.  Santa continues to track down The Killers, walking into a house, where children have received a vinyl edition of The Killers' latest album, "Battle Born", where he commences to take the record off the gramophone and smashes it in half.  The video concludes with Santa standing over lead singer Brandon Flowers' bed, laughing. The end credits roll and Santa's voice is heard as he sings "Silent Night". This is the third time The Killers collaborated with Ryan Pardey.

Chart performance

References

The Killers songs
American Christmas songs
2012 singles
Black comedy music
Songs about Santa Claus
Songs written by Brandon Flowers
Songs written by Dave Keuning
Songs written by Ronnie Vannucci Jr.
Songs written by Mark Stoermer
2012 songs
Christmas charity singles